Leaky dams are a flooding prevention measure, moderating the flow of water downstream. Barriers are added to a stream/river to prevent soil and silt escaping and allowing water to escape at a slower rate.

History 
With the regular flooding of settlements in the UK, a rethink on flood risk management was initiated. One of the proposals put forward was containing flood waters at source to prevent large volumes of water flowing downstream causing soil erosion and flooding of properties.

A variety of solutions was put forward including using naturally occurring composting materials in path of flow to hold valuable fertile silt and dam up waters over many small dams. A leaky dam was added to the arsenal of flood prevention tools. This type of structure is what nature uses for similar events. Logs from fallen trees are placed at intervals down the stream acting as a barrier, holding the silt and small debris back and allowing just the water that overflows the structure to continue the course of the stream.

Benefits 
The area surrounding the leaky dams have many benefits including better quality of water to life behind the barrier, prevention of soil erosion, available nutrients for wildlife, stabilisation of river banks, spawning ground for aquatic life, rooting habitat, place of nesting birds, areas of growth for microbes, algae and fungi, efficient temporary storage of water and a slow release of water into surrounding area.

Soil erosion 
After a heavy downpour, soil, gravel, silt and valuable nutrients are lost when the rains wash away the top soil. This animation of a side view of a mountain embankment shows how bad soil management contributes to tonnes of topsoil ending up in flood areas and river beds. It costs a fortune to collect the soil from river beds, estuaries and river mouths, decontaminate, transport and physically replace the reclaimed sand.

Examples 

Theses are types of barriers used by organisations in UK to prevent soil erosion and flooding downstream.

The following are possible approaches:

Observations 
Many county bodies have initiated their own trials and photographic and video recordings show positive results.

A well known project in Pickering, North Yorkshire, UK showed how effective leaky dams can be when there projected flooding risk assessment dropped from a 25% probability to about 4%.

Artificial leaky dams constructed from injection molded plastic have also been tried in some areas. Some of the benefit derived from this method is the wall doesn't corrode or compost over time requiring less management.

These are deemed soft defenses as opposed to hard defenses that include solid concrete retaining walls that cost a fortune and are unsightly to local people.

It would seem local residents, environmental agencies, local councils and budget managers are more open to a natural flow system that mimics nature and holds large volumes of water back for later draining. The biggest motivator is this method costs a fraction of the hard defenses that professional government agencies have been promoting.

References

Dams by type
Flood barriers